Jarod's Law was written in response to the 2003 death of 6 year old Jarod Bennett at Louisa Wright elementary school in Lebanon, Ohio, United States. The law was passed in 2005 but was then repealed in 2009 after allegations that the regulations proved too costly for schools to enact as written.

The accident
On December 19, 2003 Jarod Bennett was attending an after school YMCA program at Louisa Wright elementary school. Jarod was hit by a 290 lbs. cafeteria table when it tipped over onto his head. Jarod died minutes later in his mother's arms.

The response
The accident investigation revealed that the tables were known to be dangerous but were used in schools across the state anyway. Jarod's law, passed in 2005, required more inclusive safety inspections of schools.

The repeal
Jarod's law was repealed in 2009 after many of the regulations and requirements proved too costly and onerous in its regulations for most school districts.

Memorial
Jarod Park has been named in honor of Jarod Bennett. It is located near the corner of S.R. 48 and Cook Road near the school where he was killed.

References

External links
 
 The Bennet family's Jarod Law Website

Repealed United States legislation
Legal history of Ohio